Pteredoa is a genus of moths in the subfamily Lymantriinae. The genus was erected by George Hampson in 1905.

Species
Pteredoa atripalpia Hampson, 1910 Ethiopia
Pteredoa crystalloides Collenette, 1936 Zaire
Pteredoa fuscovenata (Wichgraf, 1922) eastern Africa
Pteredoa monosticta (Butler, 1898) eastern Africa
Pteredoa nigropuncta Hering, 1926 Cameroon
Pteredoa plumosa Hampson, 1905 Zimbabwe
Pteredoa siderea Hering, 1926 Kenya
Pteredoa subapicalis Hering, 1926 Mozambique
Pteredoa usebia (Swinhoe, 1903) Malawi, Mozambique, South Africa, Zambia, Zimbabwe

References

Lymantriinae